Zabolimahalleh-ye Quchmorad (also Romanized as Zābolīmaḥalleh-ye Qūchmorād) is a village in Bagheli-ye Marama Rural District, in the Central District of Gonbad-e Qabus County, Golestan Province, Iran. At the 2006 census, its population was 449, in 102 families.

References 

Populated places in Gonbad-e Kavus County